Gradišče pri Lukovici is a settlement in the Municipality of Lukovica in the eastern part of the Upper Carniola region of Slovenia.

Name
The name of the settlement was changed from Gradišče to Gradišče pri Lukovici in 1953.

Church

The local church is built is dedicated to Saint Margaret. It dates to the early 16th century.

Gradišče Reservoir
South of the settlement lies the reservoir Lake Gradišče.

References

External links 
Gradišče pri Lukovici on Geopedia

Populated places in the Municipality of Lukovica